Eldridge Tucker Hughes (March 18, 1846 – February 27, 1936) was an American politician who served one term as a member of the Virginia House of Delegates, representing Goochland and Fluvanna counties.

References

External links 

1846 births
1936 deaths
Democratic Party members of the Virginia House of Delegates
20th-century American politicians